Leo Horwitz was an Austrian figure skater who competed in pair skating.

With partner Christa von Szabó, he won bronze medals at two World Figure Skating Championships: in 1913 and 1914.

Competitive highlights 
With Christa von Szabó

References 

Austrian male pair skaters
Date of birth missing
Date of death missing